Alexandru Ștefan Pașcanu (born 28 September 1998) is a Romanian professional footballer who plays as a centre-back for Segunda División club Ponferradina.

Early life
Pașcanu grew up in Bogdănești, Vaslui County, before moving to England with his family where he spent the rest of his childhood and teenage years.

Club career
Pașcanu began his football career in the academy of Leicester City, playing alongside the likes of Ben Chilwell, Harvey Barnes and Hamza Choudhury. He was however unable to follow them into the first-team squad, and on 30 August 2019 returned to Romania to sign with reigning champions CFR Cluj for an undisclosed fee. 

Pașcanu only amassed five appearances for "the White-Burgundies", before joining fellow Liga I side Voluntari in January 2020 on a loan deal until the end of the season. On 28 August 2020, he was sent out on a two-year loan to Spanish Segunda División side Ponferradina.

On 17 January 2022, Ponferradina announced it had reached an agreement with his parent club for the permanent transfer of Pașcanu.

International career
Pașcanu started in all but one of Romania under-21's ten qualifying matches for the 2019 European Championship as the nation won its group undefeated. His performances led to a first call-up to the senior team, on 11 November 2018. In the final stage of the under-21 tournament hosted by Italy and San Marino, Pașcanu aided his side in reaching the semi-finals and thus qualified the country to the 2020 Summer Olympics.

His age also made him eligible for the 2021 edition of the European Championship, where he played in all three group stage matches. Pașcanu scored the winner in a 2–1 defeat of Hungary and surpassed Ionuț Luțu to become the most capped player at under-21 level. In July that year, he went on to participate with Romania in the postponed Summer Olympics.

On 3 March 2023, he received his first official call-up to the Romanian senior national team for the UEFA Euro 2024 qualifying matches against Andorra and Belarus.

Career statistics

Club

Honours

CFR Cluj
Romanian League: 2019–20

Individual
Leicester City U23 Player of the Season: 2016-17

References

External links

1998 births
Living people
Sportspeople from Bârlad
Romanian emigrants to the United Kingdom
Romanian footballers
Association football defenders
Liga I players
CFR Cluj players
FC Voluntari players
Segunda División players
SD Ponferradina players
Romania youth international footballers
Romania under-21 international footballers
Olympic footballers of Romania
Footballers at the 2020 Summer Olympics
Romanian expatriate footballers
Romanian expatriate sportspeople in Spain
Expatriate footballers in Spain